is a city located in Gifu, Japan. , the city had an estimated population of 41,858, and a population density of 41 persons per km2, in 15,341 households. Gujo Hachiman, a part of the city that was an independent town until 2004, and has a large summer bon odori festival, Gujo Odori.

Geography
Gujō is located in west-central Gifu Prefecture. The headwaters of the Nagara River are in the city.

Waterways
Gujō's waterways operate the same way as they did in the 17th century. The canals and fountains are still used for washing rice, vegetables, and laundry. Townspeople cooperate to keep the canals clean and the water fresh. As a result of their efforts, Gujō's drinking water is a source of local pride.

Gujō Hachiman is in a valley where three major fast-running rivers meet: the Yoshida, the Nagara and the Kodara. Pure mineral water flows from every tap in the town. The local ayu, soba, and sake all depend on the water for their flavors. Some residents still use the town's unique system of small waterways to wash laundry and dishes, following a set of very strict rules that describe what may be washed where. This practice has survived for centuries and ensures that all households have access to clean water.

Climate
The city has a climate characterized by hot and humid summers, and mild winters (Köppen climate classification Cfa).

Neighbouring municipalities
Gifu Prefecture
Takayama
Seki
Mino
Gero
Fukui Prefecture
Ōno

Demographics
According to Japanese census data, the population of Gujō has declined steadily over the past 50 years.

History
Historically, the area around Gujō was part of the former Mino Province. During the Edo period, most of the area was under the control of Gujō Domain under the  Tokugawa shogunate. During the post-Meiji restoration cadastral reforms, the area was organised into Gujō District, Gifu. The town of Hachiman was created on July 1, 1889 with the establishment of the modern municipalities system. The modern city of Gujō was established on March 1, 2004, from the merger of the towns of Hachiman, Shirotori and Yamato, and the villages of Meihō, Minami, Takasu and Wara (all from Gujō District).

Government
Gujō has a mayor-council form of government with a directly elected mayor and a unicameral city assembly of 18 members.

Economy

Food replicas
Gujō is a leading producer of food replicas in Japan. Many of the food replicas, used by restaurants to decorate their windows and inform patrons of their dishes, are produced here.

Education
Gujō has 22 public elementary schools and eight public middle schools operated by the city government, and two public high school operated by the Gifu Prefectural Board of Education.

Transportation

Railway
  - Nagaragawa Railway Etsumi-Nan Line
  -  -  -  -   -  -   -  -  -  -   -   -  -   -  -   -   -   -   -  -  -   -

Highway
 Tōkai-Hokuriku Expressway

Local attractions

 Hirugano Botanical Garden
 Gujō Hachiman Castle

Gujō Odori
The dance festival — Gujō Odori — started over 400 years ago and continues today. During the four days of Obon in mid-August, dances continue all night. The dances begin on the same night as Kyoto's Gion Festival and continue for 30 nights. They begin at the Yasaka Shrine and move to another shrine each night. The Gujō Odori Preservation Society tell musical stories through an o-hayashi, which consists of a soloist, a shamisen, a taiko, and a shakuhachi. Listeners participate by dancing around the stage. During Urabon (August 13 to 16) the dancing continues until 5 a.m. More than 20,000 visitors come to town for the odori.

References

External links

  

 
Cities in Gifu Prefecture